Sorry, Sorry may refer to:

Sorry, Sorry (album) , a 2009 album by Super Junior
"Sorry, Sorry" (Super Junior song), from the 2009 album Sorry, Sorry
"Sorry, Sorry" (Femi Kuti song), from the 1998 album Shoki Shoki
"Sorry Sorry", a song by Fareedh from the 2008 film Aatadista
"Sorry Sorry", a 1997 single by Idha
"Sorry Sorry", a song by Rooney from the 2003 album Rooney
"Sorry Sorry", a song by Sachin–Jigar from the 2013 film ABCD: Any Body Can Dance
"Sorry Sorry", a 1998 song by Sujatha Mohan from the film Bavagaru Bagunnara?
"Sorry Sorry", a single by Those French Girls, S. Kelly, N. Innes, Safari Records 1982
"Sorry Sorry", a song by Tippu and Nanditha from the 2003 film Excuse Me

See also
"Sorry, Sorry, Sorry", a 1958 single by Alma Cogan
"Sorry Sorry Sarah", a song from the 2008 album Liferz by the band Blood on the Wall